The 2012–13 Cypriot Second Division was the 58th season of the Cypriot second-level football league. It began on 15 September 2012 and ended on 11 May 2013. The defending champions were Doxa Katokopias. Aris Limassol and AEK Kouklia finished equal on points but Aris Limassol won the championship because they had a better goal difference than AEK Kouklia in the matches played between the two teams.

Team Changes from 2011–12

Teams promoted to 2012–13 Cypriot First Division
 Doxa Katokopias
 Ayia Napa
 AEP Paphos

Teams relegated from 2011–12 Cypriot First Division
 Aris Limassol
 Anagennisi Deryneia
 Ermis Aradippou

Teams promoted from 2011–12 Cypriot Third Division
 Champions: AEK Kouklia
 Runners-up: Nikos & Sokratis Erimis, AEZ Zakakiou

Teams relegated to 2012–13 Cypriot Third Division
 APOP Kinyras
 Enosis Neon Parekklisia
 Atromitos Yeroskipou

League table

Promotion group

Results

Season statistics

Top scorers
Including matches played on 11 May 2013; Source: CFA

Sources

See also
 2012–13 Cypriot First Division
 2012–13 Cypriot Cup

References 

Cypriot Second Division seasons
2012–13 in Cypriot football
Cyprus